The following is a list of players, both past and current, who appeared at least in one game for KK Partizan.



A

B

C

D

E

F

G

H

I

J

K

L

M

N

O

P

R

S

T

U

V

W

Z

Foreign players

See also 
 KK Crvena Zvezda all-time roster

External links
 

 
Lists of basketball players in Serbia
Partizan